A Date with Elvis is a compilation album by American singer and musician Elvis Presley, issued on RCA Victor (LPM 2011) in July 1959. The album compiled a selection of previously released material from multiple sessions at Sun, an August 1956 recording session at 20th Century Fox Stage One and two from Radio Recorders in Hollywood. The album reached #32 on the Billboard Top Pop Albums chart.

Content

After Presley's induction into the army on March 24, 1958, RCA Victor and his manager, Colonel Tom Parker, were faced with the prospect of keeping his name before the public for two years with no possibility of live performances, no movies, and with few unissued marketable recordings in the vault. A recording session was arranged for two days in June, which yielded enough items for five more single sides, singles being the commercial focus for rock and roll in the 1950s. Four of those tracks would be issued on 45s in 1958 and 1959 during his absence while doing military service.

Presley, however, also did well in the albums market, all but one of his previous seven LPs charting no lower than #3, and RCA Victor wished to continue issuing albums by Presley given his sales record. Much of Presley's material had not been released on LP, and for this album RCA Victor collected material previously unavailable on album. Like its predecessor For LP Fans Only, this album featured tracks that had been issued on Sun Records with limited release, and were almost impossible to locate beyond certain parts of the south. However all 5 Sun singles were reissued by RCA Victor in November 1955 and remained in print through the 1970s. The remaining five tracks derived from three different EPs issued in 1956 and 1957.

Even by the standards of the late 1950s and early 1960s, where long-playing albums often ran to only about 35 minutes, this was a very short album at twenty-three minutes, and as such became the lowest charting Presley LP of the decade. RCA Victor would squeeze one more album in 1959 out of previously issued material, the second hit singles collection, but it too would be a lower seller by previous standard. Presley would return from overseas in 1960 to commence proper recording again. This album also folds out to be a calendar for the year 1960.

A different version of the album, duplicating six tracks from the American release, but expanding the track list to a healthy fourteen, was issued in Australia on vinyl in September 1959.

Reissues
RCA first reissued the original 10-track album on compact disc in 1989. The album is also available in the 2016 boxed set, Elvis Presley - The Complete RCA Album Collection.

Collective personnel
 Elvis Presley – vocals, guitar
 Scotty Moore – guitar
 Dudley Brooks – piano
 Mike Stoller – piano, backing vocals
 Bill Black – bass
 D. J. Fontana – drums
 Johnny Bernero – drums
 The Jordanaires – backing vocals

Track listing

Original release

UK, Australian and German reissue

Chart performance

References

External links

LPM-2011 A Date With Elvis Guide (monaural) part of The Elvis Presley Record Research Database
LSP-2011(e) A Date With Elvis Guide (stereo) part of The Elvis Presley Record Research Database

1959 compilation albums
Elvis Presley compilation albums
RCA Victor compilation albums
Albums produced by Sam Phillips
Albums produced by Steve Sholes
Albums recorded at Sun Studio
Covers albums